Katelyn Falgowski (born October 23, 1988) is an American field hockey player. At the 2008, 2012 and 2016 Summer Olympics, she competed for the United States women's national field hockey team in the women's event. She was born in Wilmington, Delaware.  She has played more than 200 games for the national team.

References

External links
 

American female field hockey players
1988 births
Living people
American people of Polish descent
Olympic field hockey players of the United States
Field hockey players at the 2008 Summer Olympics
Field hockey players at the 2012 Summer Olympics
Field hockey players at the 2016 Summer Olympics
Field hockey players at the 2011 Pan American Games
North Carolina Tar Heels field hockey players
Pan American Games gold medalists for the United States
Pan American Games medalists in field hockey
Medalists at the 2011 Pan American Games
Sportspeople from Wilmington, Delaware